Hensall may refer to:

Hensall, North Yorkshire, a village and civil parish in  North Yorkshire, England
Hensall railway station, which serves the village of Hensall, North Yorkshire
Hensall, Ontario, a community in Huron County, Ontario, Canada